Xurşud (also, Khurshud and Khurshut) is a village and municipality in the Salyan Rayon of Azerbaijan.  It has a population of 708.

References 

Populated places in Salyan District (Azerbaijan)